Rohinjan-kiravali is a village situated in  Taloja, under panvel municipal corporation Navi mumbai acquired by (CIDCO) on old mumbai pune highway Rohinjan- kiravali is situated near Kharghar it has metro and railway station at  distance, is now a major attraction for new building projects. This area also has the tallest tower Adhiraj samyama of Navi Mumbai Raigad district in Maharashtra, India.

Villages in Raigad district